Shawlands RFC is an amateur rugby union side based on the south side of Glasgow and play at Dumbreck, the home of Cartha Queens Park RFC.  Former Scottish Rugby Union President, Ed Crozier has played a vital role in recent years in bring the Shawlands XV back to competitive rugby, and served as the club President from 2017 to 2019, and then took on the role again in 2022.

History

Shawlands acts as feeder club for Cartha Queens Park and train along with Cartha, under the supervision of Cartha Head Coach, Thomas Davidson, and Shawlands Head Coach, Daniel Tams.

The team missed out on promotion in the 15/16 season to Mull through points difference. In the 2017/18 Season, they reached the semi-final of the Western District bowl, losing out narrowly to Wigtownshire RFC, who went on to become runners up at Murrayfield for the Scottish Rugby Union Bowl 2017/18.

Training takes place on Tuesday and Thursdays at 6:45pm, at Dumbreck.

Shawlands Sharks
They also offer an opportunity for social rugby, with the Shawlands Sharks squad.  The Sharks regularly play in friendly triangular competitions with the GHA Gazelles and Whitecraigs Rhynos.  They also play regular matches against East Coast social sides, Dunfermline, and Edinburgh North rugby clubs.

The Sharks have also formed a close friendship with the Clayton Bootleggers Rugby Club, from North Carolina, USA, whom they played in 2019, with the Sharks coming out victorious 12–10.

Notable former players

Glasgow District players

The following former Shawlands players have represented Glasgow District at provincial level.

  Torrence Gemmell
  Phil Nelson

International Caps

The following former Shawlands players have represented their countries at International Rugby level.

References

External links
Shawlands FP RFC Scottish Rugby Homepage
Cartha Queens Park Homepage

Scottish rugby union teams
Rugby union in Glasgow
Sports teams in Glasgow
Rugby clubs established in 1906
1906 establishments in Scotland